Vitiligo is the debut album by rapper and singer Krizz Kaliko. His debut album comes after spending several years lending his voice to releases from Tech N9ne and his other labelmates. The album's title comes from the skin disorder vitiligo, which Krizz has.

The album contained several guests features, such as Tech N9ne, who appeared on a good portion of the album. Other names who appeared on the album include the group Twiztid, bay area rapper E-40 as well as several of Kaliko's fellow label mates. The clean version of the album included one more feature, King Gordy, on the track "Mirror, Mirror." Those who pre-ordered the album through F.Y.E. received a free bonus downloadable track titled "In Da Whip."

In its release week, Vitiligo found its way onto several Billboard charts. Among them were the Billboard 200 at #167, Top Independent Albums at #19 and Top Rap Albums at #20.

Track listing

References

2008 debut albums
Krizz Kaliko albums
Strange Music albums
Albums produced by Seven (record producer)